Rein Dool (born 1933) is a Dutch artist.

Dool was born in Leiden in 1933.

In December 2022, the unannounced removal of a 1970s Dool painting at Leiden University of senior male staff smoking cigars has raised questions of cancel culture.

References

Living people
1933 births
Dutch artists
Artists from Leiden